Joseph Kibuchua  is an Anglican bishop in Kenya: he has been Bishop of Kirinyaga since 2012.

References

21st-century Anglican bishops of the Anglican Church of Kenya
Anglican bishops of Kirinyaga
Year of birth missing (living people)
Living people